The 72nd British Academy Film Awards, more commonly known as the BAFTAs, were held on 10 February 2019 at the Royal Albert Hall in London, honouring the best national and foreign films of 2018. Presented by the British Academy of Film and Television Arts, accolades were handed out for the best feature-length film and documentaries of any nationality that were screened at British cinemas in 2018.

The nominees were announced on 9 January 2019 by actor Will Poulter and actress Hayley Squires. The period comedy-drama The Favourite received the most nominations: twelve across eleven categories.

English actress Joanna Lumley hosted the ceremony for the second consecutive year.

Winners and nominees

The nominees were announced on 9 January 2019. The winners were announced on 10 February 2019.

On 6 February 2019, BAFTA announced they had suspended Bryan Singer's name from Bohemian Rhapsodys nomination for Outstanding British Film following accusations against Singer concerning sexual abuse.

BAFTA Fellowship

 Thelma Schoonmaker

Outstanding British Contribution to Cinema

 Elizabeth Karlsen and Stephen Woolley for Number 9 Films

Statistics

Ceremony information
The ceremony took place at the Royal Albert Hall and was hosted by English actress Joanna Lumley for the second consecutive year. In a reference to the controversy surrounding Kevin Hart's removal as host of the 91st Academy Awards, Lumley said that she suspects she probably would not have been hosting the ceremony if she were on Twitter. It opened with a performance from Cirque du Soleil for the third consecutive year and was broadcast after a short delay on BBC One.

The period comedy-drama The Favourite received the most nominations with twelve and won seven, including Outstanding British Film, Best Actress in a Leading Role for Olivia Colman, and Best Actress in a Supporting Role for Rachel Weisz. Roma won four awards, including Best Film and Best Director for Alfonso Cuarón. Rami Malek won Best Actor in a Leading Role for Bohemian Rhapsody, thanking Freddie Mercury in his acceptance speech.

The In Memoriam section paid tribute to those who had died during the previous year, including Albert Finney, William Goldman, Penny Marshall, Burt Reynolds and Nicolas Roeg. The segment was accompanied by saxophonist Jess Gillam, who performed "(Where Do I Begin?) Love Story", the title song from the film Love Story, as composed by Francis Lai, who also was featured in the tribute. Thelma Schoonmaker won the BAFTA Fellowship, presented by Cate Blanchett and Prince William. She joined the fellowship along with her late husband Michael Powell and long-term collaborator Martin Scorsese. Elizabeth Karlsen and Stephen Woolley won the BAFTA Outstanding British Contribution to Cinema Award for their contributions to Number 9 Films.

Presenters
 Melissa McCarthy presented Outstanding British Film
 Lily Collins and Olga Kurylenko presented Best Animated Film and Best Production Design
 Jason Isaacs presented Best British Short Animation
 Henry Golding and Eleanor Tomlinson presented Best Sound and Best Editing
 Lucy Boynton and Joseph Fiennes presented Best Documentary and Best Hair and Makeup
 Bill Nighy presented the BAFTA Outstanding British Contribution to Cinema Award
 Mary J. Blige and Elliot Page presented Best Actress in a Supporting Role
 Luke Evans and Regina King presented the EE Rising Star Award
 Yalitza Aparicio and Marina de Tavira presented Best Adapted Screenplay
 Danai Gurira and Andy Serkis presented Best Original Music
 Elizabeth Debicki and Michelle Rodriguez presented Best Original Screenplay
 Viola Davis presented Best Actor in a Supporting Role
 Will Poulter and Michelle Yeoh presented Best Cinematography
 Riz Ahmed and Rachel Brosnahan presented Outstanding Debut by a British Writer, Director or Producer
 Jamie Bell, Taron Egerton, and Richard Madden presented Best Special Visual Effects
 Thandie Newton and Sophie Okonedo presented Best Film Not in the English Language
 Cynthia Erivo and Eddie Marsan presented Best Costume Design
 Salma Hayek presented Best Director
 Gary Oldman presented Best Actress in a Leading Role
 Margot Robbie presented Best Actor in a Leading Role
 Chiwetel Ejiofor presented Best Film
 Cate Blanchett and Prince William presented the BAFTA Fellowship

In Memoriam

Albert Finney
Fenella Fielding
Anne V. Coates
Michael Anderson
Robbie Little
Samuel Hadida
Neil Simon
Isao Takahata
Nicolas Roeg
Linda Gregory
Ronnie Taylor
Michel Legrand
Andrew G. Vajna
Francis Lai
Bernardo Bertolucci
John Chambers
William Goldman
Stan Lee
Michael Seymour
Lewis Gilbert
Miloš Forman
Tab Hunter
Penny Marshall
Margot Kidder
Yvonne Blake
Liz Fraser
Michael D. Ford
Burt Reynolds

See also
 8th AACTA International Awards
 91st Academy Awards
 44th César Awards
 24th Critics' Choice Awards
 71st Directors Guild of America Awards
 32nd European Film Awards
 76th Golden Globe Awards
 39th Golden Raspberry Awards
 33rd Goya Awards
 34th Independent Spirit Awards
 24th Lumières Awards
 9th Magritte Awards
 6th Platino Awards
 30th Producers Guild of America Awards
 23rd Satellite Awards
 45th Saturn Awards
 25th Screen Actors Guild Awards
 71st Writers Guild of America Awards

References

External links
 

2018 film awards
2019 in British cinema
2019 in London
Film072
February 2019 events in the United Kingdom
Events at the Royal Albert Hall
2018 awards in the United Kingdom